Mount Kliment Ohridski is the highest ridge (1422m) in the Sofia University Mountains on Alexander Island, Antarctica.  The feature extends 7 km in the northwest–southeast direction with partly ice-free southern slopes. Shaw Nunatak is located in Nichols Snowfield 4 km off the southeast extremity of Mount Kliment Ohridski.

Following field work in northern Alexander Island by a joint British-Bulgarian party during the summer of 1987–88, the peak was named for Clement of Ohrid in association with the St. Kliment Ohridski University of Sofia.

Location

Maps
 British Antarctic Territory. Scale 1:200000 topographic map No. 3127. DOS 610 - W 69 70. Tolworth, UK, 1971.
 Antarctic Digital Database (ADD). Scale 1:250000 topographic map of Antarctica. Scientific Committee on Antarctic Research (SCAR), 1993–2016.

Notes

References
 Mount Kliment Ohridski. SCAR Composite Gazetteer of Antarctica
 Bulgarian Antarctic Gazetteer. Antarctic Place-names Commission. (details in Bulgarian, basic data in English)

External links
 Mount Kliment Ohridski. Copernix satellite image

Mountains of Alexander Island
Ridges of Alexander Island
Bulgaria and the Antarctic